Hemanta Bahadur B.C. is a Nepalese politician and the chairman of the Communist Party of Nepal (United Marxist). He was a leading member of the Communist Party of Nepal (United), prior to the merger of that party into the Communist Party of Nepal (United Marxist). When the United Left Front was constituted in 2002, he became its treasurer.

References

Communist Party of Nepal (United Marxist) politicians
Communist Party of Nepal (United) politicians
Living people
Year of birth missing (living people)